The 57th Annual Miss Universe Puerto Rico pageant was held at the Centro de Bellas Artes de Santurce in San Juan, Puerto Rico on November 7, 2011.

Viviana Ortiz, who won the title of Miss Universe Puerto Rico 2011, crowned her successor Bodine Koehler as Miss Universe Puerto Rico 2012, who represented Puerto Rico at Miss Universe 2012 on December 19, 2012 in Las Vegas, Nevada, USA.

Also, Stephanie Román, Chanty Vargas, and Valery Velez, who were chosen to represent Puerto Rico at Miss Continente Americano, Miss Intercontinental, and Miss Supranational, also crowned their successors to represent Puerto Rico at Miss Continente Americano 2012, Miss Intercontinental 2012 and Miss Supranational 2012.

In addition to that, Top Model of the World Puerto Rico 2012 was also crowned. On March 15, 2012, when Vanessa De Roide was crowned Nuestra Belleza Latina 2012 and was forced to give up the title of Miss Intercontinental Puerto Rico, Desiree Lowry, the director of the franchise Miss Universe Puerto Rico, said they were thinking of choosing a candidate detail to represent Puerto Rico at Miss Intercontinental in October in Germany.

Results

Placements

Special awards

Castings
Casting calls were held throughout Puerto Rico during the summer of 2011. Only 39 became the official contestants in an event on July 10, 2011 in Teatro Ambassador in San Juan. The judges of the final choice were trainer, Jackie Rodriguez, stylist, Junior Melendez, ex-Miss Puerto Rico contestant, Mari Tere Benes, choreographer, Estela Velez, designers, Richard Cotto and Rebecca Tiago and beauty queens expert Edgardo Virella.

Contestants
Here is a list of the official 39 contestants:

Notes
 Miss Rio Grande, Bodine Koehler, is a well known teen model in the island. Also, Miss World 1959 is the sister/cousin of Bodine's father, she's practically Bodine's aunt. Corine Spier-Rottschäfer also participated at Miss Universe 1958 and was a Semi-finalist and won Miss Photogenic. She currently has a Model Agency. She represented Puerto Rico at Miss Universe 2012 in Las Vegas, Nevada, USA where she failed to make the semi-finals.
 Miss Arroyo, Jennifer Guevara, competed at Miss World 2007 representing Puerto Rico. She finished in the Top 16 and was chosen as 1st runner-up on the Top Model competition
 Miss Carolina, Vanessa De Roide, competed at Miss Earth 2005 representing Puerto Rico. She finished in Top 8 and won the Best in Long Gown Award. She later became Nuestra Belleza Latina 2012.
 Miss Yabucoa, Darla Pacheco, competed at Miss Puerto Rico Universe 2009. She finished in the Top 20. She also competed at Miss International Beauty 2009 in which she finished as 3rd runner-up. She won Miss Earth Puerto Rico 2012 and represented Puerto Rico in Miss Earth 2012.
 Miss Aguas Buenas, Nadyalee Torres López, competed at Top Model of the World 2012 contest where she was a Semi-finalist in the Top 15 and won Miss Photogenic. She later won the Miss Mundo de Puerto Rico 2013 and competed at Miss World 2013.
 Miss Toa Alta, Gabriela Berríos, later competed at and won Miss Universe Puerto Rico 2014 representing Toa Baja. She represented Puerto Rico at Miss Universe 2014 and won Miss Photogenic.

Historical significance
 Río Grande won Miss Universe Puerto Rico for the second time, the last was Mariana Vicente in 2010.
 The following municipalities also made the semi-finals last year were Loíza, Mayagüez, Toa Alta, and Toa Baja.
 Toa Baja placed for the third consecutive year.
 Aguas Buenas last placed in 1998.
 Camuy last placed in 2000.
 Yauco last placed in 2001.
 Morovis last placed in 2002.
 Lares last placed in 2004.
 Lajas last placed in 2006.
 Río Grande, Cayey and Yabucoa last placed in 2010.
 Aguada, Arroyo, and Sabana Grande had their first placements.

References

2011 in Puerto Rico
Puerto Rico 2012
2011 beauty pageants